The men's javelin throw was one of four men's throwing events on the Athletics at the 1964 Summer Olympics program in Tokyo.  It was held on 14 October 1964.  27 athletes from 17 nations entered, with 2 not starting in the qualification round.

Results

Qualification

The qualification standard was 77.00 metres.  Each thrower had three attempts to reach that standard.  Since only one thrower made the mark the next eleven farthest-throwing athletes also advanced to meet the minimum 12 in the final.

Final

The scores from the qualification round were ignored in the final.  Each thrower received three more attempts.  The six best threw an additional three times, keeping the scores from all six throws.

References

Athletics at the 1964 Summer Olympics
Javelin throw at the Olympics
Men's events at the 1964 Summer Olympics